The 2013–14 season was the 112th season of football for Norwich City. It was Norwich City's third campaign in the Premier League since achieving promotion during the 2010–11 season and was their 24th season in the top flight of English football.  Norwich spent most of the season in the bottom half of the Premier League table, but only in two short periods, in September and October, were they actually in the relegation zone and this is where they slipped back to in the final few matches of the season. They finished the season in eighteenth place in the Premier League and were subsequently relegated to the Championship.  Norwich lost in a replay to Fulham in the third round of the FA Cup and to Manchester United in the fourth round of the League Cup. It was a season that saw the sacking of manager Chris Hughton and the appointment of former Norwich player Neil Adams as his replacement with five games left to play.

Build up to the season

Expectations were high for Norwich after they finished the previous season in 11th position in the league, their highest league finish since 1992–93. The £13.5 million profit made during the 2011–12 season, and the prospect of becoming debt free, also raised the expectations of the fans with the prospect of significant spending on players over the summer 2013 transfer window.

Players and club staff

Summer transfer window

Transfers out
Following their 11th-place finish in the 2012–13 Premier League Norwich started their preparations for their third consecutive season in the top flight by releasing ten players in May 2013 including first team players Chris Martin, Simeon Jackson, Elliot Ward and Marc Tierney. Over the course of the summer James Vaughan, Grant Holt, Leon Barnett and Jacob Butterfield were all sold for undisclosed fees. Former Norwich City manager Paul Lambert returned to his former club to sign goalkeeper Jed Steer for his current club Aston Villa but the decision on a fee went to tribunal. During the summer Declan Rudd and Andrew Surman were both loaned out to lower league clubs for the season. During the lower league loan window David Fox and Daniel Ayala were loaned for half of the season.

Grant Holt's exit followed a very successful period at the club including two promotions, being named Norwich City F.C. Player of the Season three times and being top scorer at the club four seasons in a row.  Holt blamed the tactics of Chris Hughton as a contributory factor in his exit, along with the prospect of playing Europa League football for the first time.

Transfers in
The summer transfer window was a record breaking one for Norwich with both a record amount spent in total and a record amount spent on a single player. The task of building on the successes of the previous season for the 2013–14 season started while the 2012–13 season was still in progress when during March 2013 it was announced that Ricky van Wolfswinkel had signed for a reported club record fee of £8.5 million. Javier Garrido who had been with Norwich the previous season signed a two-year permanent deal during May 2013. During the summer Gary Hooper, Leroy Fer, Carlo Nash, Martin Olsson and Nathan Redmond all also signed permanent deals. Norwich first attempted to sign Hooper during the January 2013 transfer window with a number of bids reported to have been rejected but he eventually signed during July 2013 for £5 million. In August 2013 Johan Elmander signed on a season long loan deal.

† effective July 2013

January transfer window

Transfers in
On 13 January Jonás Gutiérrez signed on loan from Newcastle United. On 30 January Joseph Yobo signed from Fenerbahçe on loan.

Transfers out
After his original three-month loan deal at Middlesbrough expired Daniel Ayala made his move permanent on 24 January for an undisclosed fee. On 7 February it was announced Jacob Murphy would be joining Swindon Town for a month when the loan window opens (8 February).

Pre-season matches

Norwich started their build up to the season with a pre-season tour of the United States. It continued with away games against Brighton and Braga and concluded with two home games against Panathinaikos and Real Sociedad.

Note: first-team friendlies only

Premier League season

August

Norwich started their league season with a home draw with Everton with record signing Ricky van Wolfswinkel scoring a 71st-minute equaliser on his debut. This was followed up with a 1–0 away defeat by Hull City. Hull spent an hour with ten men following Yannick Sagbo's red card for an apparent head butt motion towards Russell Martin. Norwich earned their first win of the season with a 1–0 home win over Southampton in which Nathan Redmond scored his first goal for the club.

September

Norwich's poor away form continued with a 2–0 away defeat by Tottenham Hotspur. The run of defeats continued when Aston Villa's visit to Carrow Road ended in a 1–0 defeat. Norwich scored their first away goal of the season in their first ever win at the Britannia Stadium when they beat Stoke City 1–0.

October

Norwich got back into the game against Chelsea with a goal from Anthony Pilkington but conceded two late goals to finish 1–3 to the visitors. This was followed up with a 4–1 away defeat by Arsenal. The home fixture against Cardiff City finished in controversy during when Leroy Fer put the ball in the back of the net when passing the ball back to goalkeeper David Marshall. This resulted in a melee in which both Norwich and Cardiff were fined £20,000 by the FA for failing to control their players. The game was also notable with Norwich having 31 shots at goal despite the game finishing as a draw.

November

November started badly with a 7–0 defeat at Manchester City following a 4–0 defeat against Manchester United in the League Cup earlier in the week. This heavy defeat following on from a run of bad form resulted in calls from fans for Chris Hughton to be replaced as manager. Norwich responded to the defeat the following week with a 3–1 comeback win over West Ham United. Gary Hooper's first Premier League goal from the penalty spot marked the start of the comeback and it was completed with goals from Robert Snodgrass and Leroy Fer. Norwich's poor away form continued after the international break with a 2–1 defeat at Newcastle United which stretched their away record to five defeats out of six matches. The run of injuries continued when Anthony Pilkington was stretchered off with a suspected hamstring injury. The 1–0 home win over Crystal Palace was watched by a record all-seater home attendance at Carrow Road in a match which was Tony Pulis' first game in charge of the visitors.

December

Norwich's poor away form continued at Anfield with Liverpool winning 5–1.  Luis Suarez scored four of the goals which was Suárez's third hat-trick against Norwich in three seasons and extended his run to eleven goals in five games against Norwich. Three days after their mauling at Liverpool, Norwich were again on the road travelling to West Bromwich Albion where goals from Gary Hooper and Leroy Fer saw them climb up to 14th in the table. The return to Carrow Road for the match against Swansea City saw Hooper score his fourth goal in six games to equalise following Nathan Dyer's opener. The final game before Christmas saw Norwich travel to the Stadium of Light where the goalless draw saw reach Norwich 19 points, six points clear of the relegation zone, and ensure that Sunderland went into Christmas three points adrift of the bottom of the table. Hooper scored his fifth goal in eight games in a Boxing Day defeat by Fulham. The year finished poorly with a 0–1 home defeat by defending champions Manchester United seeing the Canaries pick up only two points from a possible twelve.

January

The new year started with a 1–1 draw in the return fixture against Crystal Palace at Selhurst Park. This was a poor game for Leroy Fer who gave away a penalty for the equaliser and was also sent off for a second yellow card in the 82nd minute. The run of games without a win continued when Norwich visited Liverpool to play Everton where goals from Gareth Barry and Kevin Mirallas saw Norwich come away with nothing. The following game saw loan signing Jonas Gutiérrez make his debut for Norwich and the 1–0 win saw Norwich move up to twelfth in the table level on points with visitors Hull. The midweek match which followed a weekend off at home to Newcastle ended in a goalless draw.  Both teams finished with ten men after an altercation between Loïc Rémy and Bradley Johnson. Norwich appealed against the decision to send Johnson off. An Independent Regulatory Commission upheld the appeal and the red card was rescinded.

February

Robert Snodgrass scored early on to give Norwich the lead at half time during the Cardiff City away fixture.  The second half of the game started with two quick goals from Craig Bellamy and Kenwyne Jones to see Cardiff come back to win the game. The next game was a visit from title challenging Manchester City which Norwich were expected to lose. Norwich defended well to earn a point and could have won the game when they had a goal disallowed for offside. The following Tuesday Norwich visited West Ham where two late goals from the home side saw them slip to one point above the relegation zone. The defeat saw pressure build once more on Chris Hughton following an interview with Norwich chief executive David McNally. The next match saw champions league chasing Tottenham Hotspur visit Carrow Road where a single Robert Snodgrass goal proving to be enough to take the lead and a number of fine saves saw John Ruddy ensure Norwich kept their fourth home clean sheet in a row.

March

Norwich started their match against Aston Villa with a goal after three minutes by Wes Hoolahan, who nearly joined them in the January transfer window.  Hoolahan's goal was a high point of the match after four goals were scored by the home side in sixteen minutes to consign Norwich to another away defeat. Norwich took the lead in the second half of their next match at home to Stoke City thanks to a goal from Bradley Johnson.  Jonathan Walters equalised for Stoke City but shortly afterwards was sent off for a foul on Alex Tettey.  Norwich failed to make use of the extra man and the game finished as a draw. The following week saw Norwich travel to Southampton where they conceded after five minutes.  By eighty minutes Norwich looked out of the game when the score had increased to 3–0 to the home side.  Two quick goals from Norwich raised hopes of an unlikely point but the result was put beyond doubt when Southampton scored in time added on to make the final score 4–2. The following game, at home to Sunderland, was another game that was billed as "must win" in the media.  Goals from Robert Snodgrass and Alex Tettey saw Norwich cruise past Sunderland in the end and lifted them to thirteenth in the table and seven points clear of the bottom three. The trip to Swansea saw Norwich concede three goals and meant that Norwich had lost six away games in a row.

April

Their next match against West Brom was a crucial one, but a poor performance saw them lose by a single goal dragging them closer to the relegation zone. The defeat saw angry scenes after the game with fans chanting for Chris Hughton to be sacked and also saw John Ruddy climb over the barrier to remonstrate with one of the home fans in the Barclay Stand. This result was the final straw for the club board who sacked Chris Hughton along with Colin Calderwood and Paul Trollope and named Neil Adams as his replacement. Adams' first game in charge was against Fulham, a team that they had not beaten at Craven Cottage since 1986. The game was settled by a single first half Hugo Rodallega goal. Norwich entertained league leaders Liverpool for the Easter Sunday match.  The game looked like turning into a rout when Liverpool scored two early goals but a strong second half saw Norwich fight back before eventually losing 2–3. Norwich's next game, at Manchester United, came at the end of a week which saw the hosts sack manager David Moyes and appoint Ryan Giggs as interim player-manager.  Two goals apiece from Wayne Rooney and Juan Mata saw Norwich slump to their fifth defeat in a row overall and seventh away defeat in a row.

May

Norwich went into the final away match against Chelsea knowing that defeat would mean relegation to the Championship after Sunderland beat Manchester United the day before. Norwich ended a run of eight successive away defeats and five defeats overall by holding Chelsea to a goalless draw. This was their first away point since New Years Day.  Norwich manager Neil Adams believed that his team should have got more from the game after they were denied a penalty. The result left Norwich favourites for relegation and two points behind fourth bottom Sunderland with one game left to play. Relegation was effectively sealed by a victory for Sunderland against West Brom which left Norwich three points behind West Brom with their vastly inferior goal difference. Relegation was confirmed on the final day of the season when they lost at home to Arsenal.

League table

Results summary

Results by matchday

FA Cup

The third round of the FA Cup drew Norwich against Fulham, a team they had also played at home a week before in the league. Chris Hughton made eight changes to the team that played against Crystal Palace on New Year's Day.  These included naming Josh Murphy in his starting line-up for the match, his first start for the club. During the game Josh Murphy was substituted for his twin brother Jacob Murphy who was making his professional début. The match finished 1–1 following a Robert Snodgrass equaliser on 45 minutes. Chris Hughton made six changes for the replay which finished 3–0 to the home side after goals from Darren Bent, Ashkan Dejagah and Steve Sidwell.

League Cup

Despite making eight changes to the starting eleven Norwich started their League Cup campaign brightly with an entertaining 6–3 win at home to Bury with Johan Elmander scoring two of the six goals. The third round of the cup saw Norwich win away at Watford 3–2. Norwich were two goals down on 55 minutes but a goal from Josh Murphy, who was making his professional début, on 77 minutes inspired an extra time comeback. Chris Hughton again made eight changes for the fifth round of the cup which saw Norwich travel to Manchester United where two late goals resulted in a one-sided looking 4–0 defeat.

Aftermath of the season

Finishing 18th in the Premier League resulted in relegation to the Championship for the following season. The Norwich City board announced shortly after relegation was confirmed on 11 May 2014 that a new manager would be announced within the week. On 22 May 2014, Neil Adams was named as the permanent manager despite the relegation from this season and four defeats in five matches as caretaker manager. The upheaval at the club was not limited to change in the management team, with a number of first team players being linked to moves away from Carrow Road, including Robert Snodgrass, Gary Hooper and John Ruddy. Chairman Alan Bowkett responded to the reports by stating that the club would be under no pressure to sell players during the transfer window.

The 2014 summer transfer window started for Norwich with attacking signings of Lewis Grabban from AFC Bournemouth and Kyle Lafferty from 2013–14 Serie B champions Palermo on 27 June. This was followed by the sale of Scotland international Robert Snodgrass to Hull City for a fee reported to be in the region of £7 million on 30 June 2014. On 5 August, Norwich announced the signing of former Queens Park Rangers midfielder Gary O'Neil following his release at the end of the previous season. Anthony Pilkington was the next to leave, joining promotion rivals Cardiff City for a reported fee of £1 million on 15 August. Newly promoted Queens Park Rangers completed the transfer of Leroy Fer for a reported fee of £8,000,000 on 20 August. Also on 20 August, it was announced that Carlos Cuéllar had signed a one-year deal following his release from Sunderland at the end of the previous season, and that Cameron Jerome had signed from Stoke City on a three-year deal for an undisclosed fee.

On 2 June 2014, Norwich named under-21 coach Mark Robson and former player Gary Holt first team coaches.  They also named former player and Ipswich Town manager Joe Royle as football consultant.

There was criticism of the summer 2013 transfer activity, including at record signing Ricky van Wolfswinkel, who was rated as one of the worst signings of the season by various critics Norwich City chief executive David McNally admitted that the club had got the summer transfer window "horribly wrong".

Norwich City announced on 25 October 2014 that they made a profit of £6.7 million from the 2013–14 season, with their revenue rising to £95.5 million from £78.7 million the previous season. They also made £64.5 million from Premier League broadcast payments during the season, which was more than the £60.8 million that Manchester United received for winning the Premier League title the previous season.

Statistics
Last updated: 11 May 2014
Sources:

Overall competition record

Appearances, goals and cards

Status (Premier League eligibility):
HG = Home grown player named in 25-man squad
PL = Non home grown player named in 25-man squad
U21 = Under 21 players

Source: Premier League Squad list:

Goalscorers

Other statistics
Norwich's total of 28 league goals in total were the fewest in the 2013–14 Premier League season.  
Only two teams, Fulham and Cardiff, conceded more goals than Norwich during the League season.  
Norwich's 14 away defeats was the most in the league.
Norwich's 9 away points was the worst in the league.
Norwich's 8 away defeats in a row was the joint worst in the league.

See also
List of Norwich City F.C. seasons

References

Norwich City
Norwich City F.C. seasons